Gary Arthur Myers (August 16, 1937 – October 31, 2020) was an American politician who served as a member of the U.S. House of Representatives for Pennsylvania's 25th congressional district from 1975 to 1979.

Early life and education
Gary Myers was born in Toronto, Ohio, and grew up in Evans City, Pennsylvania. He earned a Bachelor of Science degree from the University of Cincinnati in 1960 and a Master of Business Administration from the University of Pittsburgh in 1964.

Career 
Myers pursued a professional career in mechanical and industrial engineering as a steel mill turn foreman. He served in the Air Force Reserve Command from 1961 to 1968. He was an unsuccessful candidate for Congress in 1972.

Congress 
He was elected as a Republican to the 94th Congress in 1974, defeating incumbent Democratic Congressman Frank M. Clark. He chose not to be a candidate for reelection in 1978 and returned to work as a steel mill foreman.

As a member of the United States House Committee on Oversight and Reform, he worked to amend Title 39 of the United States Code to prohibit franked mailing by members of Congress and certain officers of the United States. As a member of the United States House Committee on Ways and Means, he advocated for the Automobile Efficiency Tax Incentive Act. Myers also sponsored a bill that would prohibit the U.S. Consumer Product Safety Commission from restricting the sale or manufacture of firearms or ammunition.

Retirement 
Myers did not seek re-election in 1978, citing his desire to spend more time with his wife and two children. The Myers family moved back to their home in Butler, Pennsylvania. A few months later, he rejoined the Armco Steel Company.

Personal life 
Myers died in Sebastian, Florida, on October 31, 2020.

References

1937 births
2020 deaths
People from Toronto, Ohio
People from Butler, Pennsylvania
People from Sebastian, Florida
University of Cincinnati alumni
Joseph M. Katz Graduate School of Business alumni
Republican Party members of the United States House of Representatives from Pennsylvania